Benjamin's Crossing is a 1996 historical novel written by Jay Parini about the Jewish critic and philosopher Walter Benjamin, and his escape over the Pyrenees from Nazi occupied France into Spain. It was a New York Times Notable Book of the year in 1997.

Praise 

 The New York Times "Parini's story is at once painstakingly researched and dramatically recounted. It locates Benjamin's mystifying traits in a vivid and believable psychology. And it has something important to tell us, not just about Benjamin but about the role of the intellectual in modern Western society."
 The New Yorker "A brisk, moving novel containing a parable without confining itself to a parable's two-dimensionality."
 Booklist: "Parini's vital and affecting vision of Benjamin will do much to preserve Benjamin's precious legacy."
 Publishers Weekly "In a formidable display of intellectual and imaginative sympathy, Parini novelizes the life and death of Walter Benjamin, one of the major literary and cultural critics of the twentieth century."
 The Philadelphia Inquirer "Parini's exquisite achievement-and exquisite is exactly the word for his poet's fluid prose-is that the social criticism he channels through Walter Benjamin in this novel is as troubling today as then."
 Kirkus Reviews "A moving, impressively informed novel based on the life of one of the century's most austere, provocative, and tragic intellectuals, Walter Benjamin."

References

1996 American novels
Books about philosophers
Walter Benjamin
American historical novels